The FIBT World Championships 2012 took place from 13 to 26 February 2012 at the bobsleigh, luge, and skeleton track in Lake Placid, New York for the tenth time. Lake Placid had previously hosted the World Championships in 1949, 1961, 1969, 1973, 1978, 1983, 1997 (skeleton), 2003 (men's bobsleigh), and 2009.

Lake Placid was awarded the 2013 championships at the 2009 FIBT Annual Congress meeting in Moscow on 31 May 2009, but the 2013 location was switched to St. Moritz, Switzerland, in December 2010. The FIBT switched the locations to accommodate a shorter trip for athletes and equipment to Sochi, Russia, in 2013 so that athletes will gain practice time on the 2014 Olympic track in Sochi.

Bobsleigh

Two-man

Four-man

Two-woman

Skeleton

Men

Women

Mixed team
The mixed team eventconsisting of one run each of men's skeleton, women's skeleton, 2-man bobsleigh, and 2-women bobsleighdebuted at the 2007 championships. The United States won its first mixed team championship, halting Germany's streak of four consecutive championships since the event was introduced.

Medal table

References

 

IBSF World Championships
International sports competitions hosted by the United States
Sports in Lake Placid, New York
2012 in bobsleigh
2012 in skeleton
2012 in American sports
Bobsleigh in the United States